Qasemabad-e Sarui (also Romanized as Qāsemābād-e Sārū’ī; also known as Qāsemābād, Sārū’, Sārū’ī, and Sārū’īyeh) is a village in Naqsh-e Rostam Rural District, in the Central District of Marvdasht County, Fars Province, Iran. At the 2006 census, its population was 1,953, in 462 families.

References 

Populated places in Marvdasht County